Enrique Andrade Ornelas (born September 17, 1980) is a Mexican professional boxer. A two-time world title challenger, Ornelas challenged for the WBO super middleweight title in 2010, as well as the WBA light heavyweight title in 2012.

Background
Born in Jesús del Monte, Guanajuato, Mexico, Ornelas is the younger brother of super middleweight contender Librado Andrade.

Career
Ornelas began his professional career on 16 October 1999, beating previously unbeaten Rigoberto Placencia on points over four rounds at the Marriott Hotel, Irvine, California].

Ornelas vs. Hopkins
On December 2, 2009, Ornelas fought Bernard Hopkins through 12-rounds but lost a unanimous decision. The bout took place in the light heavyweight division and Ornelas had never fought that high up in weight before.

First title shot
Ornelas is in Montreal training for his first shot at a world title as he faces WBO champion Robert Stieglitz set for November 20. Stieglitz was stopped by Ornelas brother Librado Andrade in 2008 and will be making the third defense of the WBO crown.

He now makes his home in La Habra, California.

Professional boxing record

|align="center" colspan=8|30 Wins (20 knockouts, 10 decisions), 6 Losses (1 by knockout, 5 by decision), 0 Draws 
|-
| align="center" style="border-style: none none solid solid; background: #e3e3e3"|Res.
| align="center" style="border-style: none none solid solid; background: #e3e3e3"|Opponent
| align="center" style="border-style: none none solid solid; background: #e3e3e3"|Type
| align="center" style="border-style: none none solid solid; background: #e3e3e3"|Rd
| align="center" style="border-style: none none solid solid; background: #e3e3e3"|Date
| align="center" style="border-style: none none solid solid; background: #e3e3e3"|Location
| align="center" style="border-style: none none solid solid; background: #e3e3e3"|Notes
|-align=center
| || align=left| TBA
| ||-(8)  || 
|align=left| 
|align=left|
|-align=center
| || align=left| Robert Stieglitz
| || 12  || 
|align=left| 
|align=left|
|-align=center
| || align=left| Julius Fogle
| || 4  || 
|align=left| 
|align=left|
|-align=center
| || align=left| Bernard Hopkins
| || 12  || 
|align=left|  
|align=left|
|-align=center
| || align=left| Roberto Baro
| || 4  || 
|align=left| 
|align=left|
|-align=center
| || align=left| Marco Antonio Rubio
| || 12  || 
|align=left| 
|align=left|
|-align=center
| || align=left| Daryl Salmon
| || 2  || 
|align=left| 
|align=left|
|-align=center
| || align=left| Norberto Bravo
| || 7  || 
|align=left| 
|align=left|
|-align=center
| || align=left| Bronco McKart
| || 5  || 
|align=left| 
|align=left|
|-align=center
| || align=left| Bronco McKart
| || 12  || 
|align=left| 
|align=left|
|-align=center
| || align=left| Sam Soliman
| || 10  || 
|align=left| 
|align=left|
|-align=center
| || align=left| Raul Munoz
| || 1  || 
|align=left| 
|align=left|
|-align=center

References

External links

Boxers from Guanajuato
Middleweight boxers
1980 births
Living people
Mexican male boxers